Vladimir Yuryevich Ivanov (born 9 February 1976) is a former Russian professional football player.

Ivanov played in the Russian First Division with FC Nosta Novotroitsk.

Honours
 Russian Second Division Zone Ural/Povolzhye best midfielder: 2005.

External links
 

1976 births
Living people
Russian footballers
FC Torpedo Miass players
FC Sodovik Sterlitamak players
Association football defenders
FC Nosta Novotroitsk players